The Netherlands Antilles competed at the 1968 Summer Olympics in Mexico City, Mexico. Five competitors, three men and two women, took part in four events in two sports.

Results by athlete

Fencing

Ivonne Witteveen
Women's foil — First round: 6th place in group B with 1 win and 4 losses (did not advance)
lost to 
defeated 
lost to 
lost to 
lost to 
Myrna Anselma
Women's foil — First round: 6th place in group E with 1 win and 5 losses (did not advance)
lost to 
lost to 
lost to 
lost to 
defeated 
lost to 
Jan Boutmy
Men's sabre — First round: 6th place in group E with 1 win and 5 losses (did not advance)
lost to 
lost to 
lost to 
lost to 
lost to 
defeated

Weightlifting

Rudy Monk
Middleweight
Press: 132.5 kg
Snatch: 117.5 kg
Jerk: 150.0 kg
Total: 400.0 kg (→ 16th place)

Fortunato Rijna
Light-heavyweight
Press: 142.5 kg
Snatch: 115.0 kg
Jerk: 162.5 kg
Total: 420.0 kg (→ 17th place)

References

External links
Official Olympic Reports

Nations at the 1968 Summer Olympics
1968
1968 in the Netherlands Antilles